Tatiana Gabriele Maslany (born September 22, 1985) is a Canadian actress. She rose to prominence for playing multiple characters in the science-fiction thriller television series Orphan Black (2013–2017), which won her a Primetime Emmy Award (2016), two Critics' Choice Awards (2013 and 2014), and five Canadian Screen Awards (2014–18). Maslany is the first Canadian to win an Emmy in a major dramatic category for acting in a Canadian series.

Maslany also appeared in television series such as Heartland (2008–2010), The Nativity (2010), Being Erica (2009–2011), Perry Mason (2020), and She-Hulk: Attorney at Law (2022) in the lead role of Jennifer Walters / She-Hulk. Her other notable films include Diary of the Dead (2007), Eastern Promises (2007), The Vow (2012), Picture Day (2012), Cas and Dylan (2013), Woman in Gold (2015), Stronger (2017), and Destroyer (2018). For starring in the romantic drama The Other Half (2016), she won the Canadian Screen Award for Best Actress.

Early life
Maslany was born in Regina, Saskatchewan, the daughter of Daniel Maslany, a woodworker, and Renate (née Kratz), a French–English translator and interpreter. She has two younger brothers, fellow actor Daniel Maslany and animator Michael Maslany. She has Austrian, German, Polish, Romanian, and Ukrainian ancestry. For elementary school, Maslany was in French immersion and was taught in German by her mother before learning English. Additionally, her grandparents spoke German around her as a child. She also speaks some Spanish. She has danced since age four and started community theatre and musicals at the age of nine.

Maslany attended Dr. Martin LeBoldus High School, where she participated in school productions and improvisation, and graduated in 2003. While attending high school, she found paying acting jobs that allowed her to travel all over Canada with her parents' approval. She would work for a few months at a time and then return to school in Regina. She stated, "It wasn't an easy transition. I felt a little outside of it. Outside of both experiences, really."

After completing high school, she took a gap year before entering the University of Regina, studying German, Ancient Greek, philosophy, psychology, and film. She dropped out after half a semester. She spent some time doing theatre performances and travelling before settling in Toronto, Ontario, at the age of 20.

Career
Maslany was one of the stars of the 2002 Canadian television series 2030 CE. She appeared as the character Ghost in the 2004 film Ginger Snaps 2: Unleashed. She performed comedic improvisation for 10 years; participated in improvisational theatre, including the Canadian Improv Games; and has since become a member of the General Fools Improvisational Theatre. She is a certified improvisation trainer.

In 2007, Maslany appeared in The Messengers and had a recurring role for three seasons on the CBC series Heartland. During 2008, she had a recurring role on Instant Star, provided the voice of Tatiana in Eastern Promises, and had a lead role in the Hallmark Channel film An Old Fashioned Thanksgiving. In September 2008, she portrayed a kidnapping victim in the Canadian series Flashpoint.

Maslany appeared in the second season of the Canadian television series Being Erica in 2010. Also in 2010, she appeared as the protagonist Mary, the mother of Jesus, in the British four-part television series The Nativity. Her role in Grown Up Movie Star earned Maslany a special jury breakout role award at the 2010 Sundance Film Festival. Also in 2010, she appeared in one episode of The Listener and the direct-to-video film Hardwired. In late 2011, she co-starred in the film adaptation of John Sandford's Certain Prey. In 2012, Maslany appeared as lead character Claire in Picture Day, for which she won a Phillip Borsos Award for Best Performance at the 2012 Whistler Film Festival. Also in 2012, she played the character of Sister Meir in the historical fiction mini-series World Without End.

From 2013 to 2017, Maslany starred in the BBC America and Space original series Orphan Black. She played the lead character, Sarah Manning, and Sarah's cohort of clones. Maslany won two Critics' Choice Television Awards and one TCA Award for her performance in the series. She was also nominated for a Golden Globe Award for Best Actress and in 2015 received a nomination for an Emmy Award for her performance. She was again nominated in 2016 and won the category. Maslany received a nomination for Best Lead Actress in a Drama Series at the 7th Critics' Choice Television Awards, her third total nomination from the Broadcast Television Journalists Association. The Guardian praised Maslany's performance in the series, calling it "Olympic-level acting" and praised her ability to play a series of clones who interact seamlessly with each other. In 2013, Maslany guest starred in a two-episode arc of Parks and Recreation. She portrayed the lead in the independent film Cas and Dylan, for which she won a Phillip Borsos Award for Best Performance at the 2013 Whistler Film Festival.

The 2013 Juno Award ceremonies were held in Regina, Maslany's home town, and Maslany was one of the presenters. Maslany guest starred on the season 39 finale of Saturday Night Live and played the character Bridget in the episode's second digital short entitled "Hugs". Maslany co-starred in the 2015 film Woman in Gold as a younger version of Maria Altmann, Helen Mirren's character. She mostly spoke German in the film.

Maslany starred in the independent film The Other Half with her then-partner Tom Cullen. It premiered at South by Southwest on March 12, 2016. Maslany played the lead role in the 2016 drama film Two Lovers and a Bear. The film follows the two characters as they come together in Apex, Iqaluit, to find peace in their lives. In the 2017 film Stronger, Maslany starred as Erin Hurley, the love interest of Jeff Bauman, a victim of the Boston Marathon bombing.

Maslany was cast as a series regular in the 2018 drama series Pose but was replaced by Charlayne Woodard. She starred in the crime thriller film Destroyer, which premiered at the Telluride Film Festival in August 2018. She next starred in the Broadway production of Network in 2019. Maslany starred as Sister Alice in the HBO period drama miniseries Perry Mason, which premiered in June 2020. In September 2020, Maslany was cast in the lead role of Jennifer Walters / She-Hulk for the Disney+ TV series She-Hulk: Attorney at Law, set in the Marvel Cinematic Universe.  She was set to star in AMC's six-episode series Invitation to a Bonfire, a psychological thriller set in the 1930s at an all-girls boarding school, but the show was cancelled by the network in January 2023.

Personal life
In 2022, Maslany married actor Brendan Hines.

Filmography

Film

Television

Theatre

Music videos

Video games

Audio books

Podcasts

Awards and nominations

References

External links

 
 
 

1985 births
20th-century Canadian actresses
21st-century Canadian actresses
Actresses from Regina, Saskatchewan
Canadian child actresses
Canadian expatriate actresses in the United States
Canadian film actresses
Canadian television actresses
Canadian voice actresses
Canadian people of Ukrainian descent
Canadian people of Polish descent
Canadian people of German descent
Canadian people of Romanian descent
Living people
Outstanding Performance by a Lead Actress in a Drama Series Primetime Emmy Award winners
Best Actress Genie and Canadian Screen Award winners
Best Actress in a Drama Series Canadian Screen Award winners